The Press Democrat, with the largest circulation in California's North Bay, is a daily newspaper published in Santa Rosa, California.

History

The newspaper was founded in 1897 by Ernest L. Finley who merged his Evening Press and Thomas Thompson's Sonoma Democrat (originally created as a voice for the Democratic Party).

Finley also bought the Santa Rosa Republican in 1927 and merged it with the Press Democrat in 1948.

Ernest L. Finley, his wife Ruth, daughter Ruth, and son-in-law Evert Person owned and published the "PD" between 1897 and 1985. Evert and Ruth Finley Person sold the paper to The New York Times Company in 1985.

The most popular feature in the newspaper for many years was Gaye LeBaron's community column, according to a readership survey. LeBaron produced more than 8,000 columns between 1961 and her semi-retirement in 2001, writing on human interest, cultural events, ethnic history and local politics.

The Press Democrat is now owned by Sonoma Media Investments, LLC after it was purchased from Halifax Media Group. The New York Times Company bought the paper from the Finley family in 1985, as well as the North Bay Business Journal and the Petaluma Argus-Courier, which were also acquired by the Halifax Media Holdings LLC. Halifax resold its California papers at the end of 2012 to a local ownership group that includes Douglas H. Bosco and Jean Schulz, the widow of Peanuts comic strip creator Charles M. Schulz.

In 2019, Sonoma Media Investments acquired the Sonoma County Gazette of Forestville, a monthly newspaper.

Awards and honors 
The Press Democrats staff was the winner of the 2018 Pulitzer Prize for Breaking News Reporting for "[f]or lucid and tenacious coverage of historic wildfires that ravaged the city of Santa Rosa and Sonoma County." Former staff photographer Annie Wells also won the 1997 Pulitzer Prize for Spot News Photography "for her dramatic photograph of a local firefighter rescuing a teenager from raging floodwaters."

The newspaper was also the 2004 recipient of the George Polk Award for Regional Reporting, given annually by Long Island University to honor contributions to journalistic integrity and investigative reporting.

References

External links 
 

George Polk Award recipients
Daily newspapers published in the San Francisco Bay Area
Publications established in 1897
Mass media in Santa Rosa, California
1897 establishments in California
History of Sonoma County, California
Pulitzer Prize-winning newspapers